Point Robinson is the northern point on Maury Island, Washington, United States, near the town of Vashon on Vashon Island. It extends about 2,000 meters from Maury Island.

Landforms of King County, Washington
Landforms of Puget Sound
Peninsulas of Washington (state)